The 2017–18 ISU Speed Skating World Cup, officially the ISU World Cup Speed Skating 2017–2018, was a series of international speed skating competitions that ran the entire season. Compared to previous seasons, there were fewer competition weekends; the season was restricted due to the 2018 Winter Olympics, which were arranged in Pyeongchang, South Korea, during February 2018.

Calendar
The detailed schedule for the season.

Note: the men's 5000 and 10000 metres were contested as one cup, and the women's 3000 and 5000 metres were contested as one cup, as indicated by the color coding.

In addition, there were two combination cups, the allround combination and the sprint combination. For the allround combination, the distances were 1500 + 5000 metres for men, and 1500 + 3000 metres for women. For the sprint combination, the distances were 500 + 1000 metres, both for men and women. These cups were contested only in World Cup 5, in Stavanger, Norway.

Men's standings

500 m

1000 m

1500 m

5000 and 10000 m

Mass start

Team pursuit

Team sprint

Grand World Cup

Women's standings

500 m

1000 m

1500 m

3000 and 5000 m

Mass start

Team pursuit

Team sprint

Grand World Cup

References

External links 
International Skating Union

Results at ISUresults.eu
 ISU World Cup Speed Skating Календарь Кубка мира 
 1 ISU World Cup Speed Skating. Communication No.2112 2017/18 

 
16-17
Isu Speed Skating World Cup, 2016-17
Isu Speed Skating World Cup, 2016-17